Randall Howard (born 1961) is a former South African trade unionist.

Born in the Bonteheuwel area of Cape Town, Howard was the second-oldest of fourteen children.  After completing school, he worked to support his family.  From 1986, he worked at South African Container Depots (SACD), where he clandestinely operated as a shop steward for the Transport and General Workers' Union (TGWU).  He soon became the chair of the shop stewards' committee, and organised events such as long union meeting on Friday, intended to disrupt port activities and encourage employers' to engage with the union's demands.

Howard's success led him to win election as chair of the TGWU's Western Cape branch.  In 1988, he was sacked by SACD, and began working full-time for the union, serving as deputy general secretary, then from 1994 as the union's general secretary.  He took it into a merger which formed the South African Transport and Allied Workers' Union, winning election as the new union's general secretary.

In 2006, Howard was elected as the president of the International Transport Workers' Federation.  He stood down from his union positions in 2009, when he became an advisor to Richard Baloyi, the Minister of Public Services.

References

1961 births
Living people
People from Cape Town
South African trade unionists